Vernor Winfield Smith (February 17, 1864 – July 19, 1932) was a politician in Alberta, Canada who served as the province's Minister of Railways and Telephones from 1921 until 1932.  Born in 1864 in Prince Edward Island, he moved to British Columbia in 1883 where he worked for several railway companies as an accountant.  In 1915 he moved to Camrose, Alberta to become a farmer.  The same year, he married Lily Bury, with whom he would have five children.

Smith contested the 1921 provincial election in the riding of Camrose for the United Farmers of Alberta (UFA), where he received 56% of the vote and defeated incumbent Liberal George P. Smith.  The UFA, which had never before run candidates in an election, won a surprise victory in 1921, and new premier Herbert Greenfield appointed Smith to his cabinet as Minister of Railways and Telephones.  In this capacity, Smith was responsible for dealing with a number of money-losing railways, including the Edmonton, Dunvegan and British Columbia Railway (ED&BC), that had fallen into the government's hands as a result of the collapse of the syndicates that had built them.  He favoured government ownership of these railways, while Greenfield supported selling them to the Canadian Pacific Railway (CPR).  Smith did not like the CPR, and in 1923 publicly accused it of dereliction of duty in relation to a contract it held to recondition the ED&BC; Greenfield apologized to the CPR in the legislature on behalf of the government, opening a rift between him and his minister.  One independent member of the legislative assembly speculated that "if the farmer members of the House took a vote between Greenfield and Smith" on the issue, "they would certainly take Smith."  Indeed, the issue was one of several leading the UFA to caucus to pressure Greenfield to resign in favour of his Attorney-General, John Edward Brownlee, which he did in 1925.

Resolving the railways question was one of Brownlee's top priorities, and in early 1926 he and Smith travelled to Ottawa, where they met with federal Minister of Railways Charles Avery Dunning in an unsuccessful effort to persuade him that the federal government should take over the railways.  Next they travelled to Montreal, where they reached an agreement with the Royal Bank of Canada (RBC) to acquire its shares in the ED&BC, originally valued at $2 million, for $1.3 million; this gave the government full ownership of the railway and the flexibility to sell, lease, or operate it without requiring the consent of the RBC.  Still in Montreal, Brownlee and Smith made offers to sell the railway to both the CPR and the Canadian National Railway (CNR).  Neither was interested, and on returning to Edmonton Smith repeated his recommendation for direct government operation of the railways.  Brownlee proved more receptive to the idea than Greenfield had, and the government appointed John Callaghan—a business acquaintance of Smith's and a successful railway contractor—as Superintendent of Railways.  Callaghan was successful in converting the railways to profit-making ventures, and in 1928 one of the smaller lines, the Lacombe and North Western, was sold to the CPR for $1.5 million.  The following year, the CPR purchased all remaining lines for $25 million.

Vernor Smith was re-elected in the 1926 and 1930 elections, and remained Minister of Railways and Telephones. On July 19, 1932, Smith dropped dead at his Edmonton home while preparing to meet his family at his summer cottage at Pigeon Lake. He had been suffering from angina pectoris for years and had succumbed to the condition.

Vernor Smith's great grandson is musician Mac DeMarco, whose birth name—Vernor Winfield McBriare Smith IV—was chosen in honour of the elder Smith.

Electoral record

Notes

References

 
 

1864 births
1932 deaths
Canadian accountants
Canadian farmers
People from Camrose, Alberta
People from Prince Edward Island
United Farmers of Alberta MLAs
Members of the Executive Council of Alberta